The American situation comedy It's a Living ran from October 30, 1980, to June 11, 1982, on ABC, and from September 28, 1985, to April 8, 1989, in syndication. A total of 120 episodes were produced over six seasons.

Series overview

Episodes

Season 1 (1980–1981)

Season 2 (1981–1982, as Making a Living)

Season 3 (1985–1986, as It's a Living, in first-run syndication)

Season 4 (1986–1987)

Season 5 (1987–1988)

Season 6 (1988–1989)

References

External links
 
 

Lists of American sitcom episodes